Gorenji Vrsnik is a village in the Municipality of Idrija in the traditional Inner Carniola region of Slovenia. It lies off the road from Idrija to Žiri.

The local church is dedicated to Saint Thomas and belongs to the Parish of Ledine.

References

External links 

Gorenji Vrsnik on Geopedia

Populated places in the Municipality of Idrija